Alfa Romeo 110A is model of autobus produced from Alfa Romeo between 1934 and 1950.
The bus is produced for the needs of the public transport in Milan, Italy.

Bodies
12 examples from Tallero
8 examples from Macchi
12 examples from Verasina
The bus had a higher version from Carponi from this version only 2 copies were made.

Technical characteristics
The buses used an engine with 140 hp and came with 3 different wheelbases. The engine run on gas and methane. They had 2 doors and 28 seats.

Transport
Used in Milan from ATM.
Naples

See also
 List of buses

Notes

110A
Buses articles needing expert attention